In probability theory, it is possible to approximate the moments of a function f of a random variable X using Taylor expansions, provided that f is sufficiently differentiable and that the moments of X are finite.

First moment

 

Since  the second term vanishes. Therefore,

.

It is possible to generalize this to functions of more than one variable using multivariate Taylor expansions. For example,

Second moment
Similarly,

The above is obtained using a second order approximation, following the method used in estimating the first moment. It will be a poor approximation in cases where  is highly non-linear. This is a special case of the delta method. 

Indeed, we take .

With , we get . The variance is then computed using the formula 
.  

An example is,

The second order approximation, when X follows a normal distribution, is:

First product moment
To find a second-order approximation for the covariance of functions of two random variables (with the same function applied to both), one can proceed as follows. First, note that . Since a second-order expansion for  has already been derived above, it only remains to find . Treating  as a two-variable function, the second-order Taylor expansion is as follows:

 

Hence,

See also
Propagation of uncertainty
WKB approximation
Delta method

Notes

Further reading

Statistical approximations
Algebra of random variables
Moment (mathematics)